This page details the uniforms and insignia of the Israel Defense Forces, excluding rank insignia. For ranks, see Israel Defense Forces ranks and insignia.

Uniforms

The Israel Defense Forces has several types of uniforms:
 Service dress (Madei Aleph) - "Class A" uniform; everyday wear, worn by enlisted soldiers.
 Field dress (Madei Bet) - "Class B" uniform; worn into combat, training, work on base.
 Officers service dress / Ceremonial dress (Madei Keva) - "Class A" uniform; worn by non-commissioned officers, by commissioned officers from the rank seren (Captain) and above or by other ranks during special events/ceremonies.
 Dress uniform (Madei Srad) and Mess dress (Madei Gala) - Worn only during very important ceremonies and abroad by high-ranking officers. There are several dress uniforms depending on the season and the branch. Dress uniforms follow the American model and Mess Dress uniforms follow the British and Commonwealth pattern.

The service uniform for all ground forces personnel is olive green, navy and air force uniforms are beige. The uniforms consist of a shirt, trousers, beret neatly placed under epaulet, belt and boots. Additionally a bomber jacket and sometimes a sweater are issued to optionally be worn during cold weather. Sailors are additionally issued all-white dress uniform for ceremonies. Field dress consist of olive green fatigues, the same uniform is used for winter and summer, and heavy winter gear is issued as needed. Women's dress parallels the men's but a woman may choose to substitute a skirt for the trousers, or sandals for boots. NCOs and Officers with the rank of Captain or above wear different dress uniforms depending on the branch. Ground forces wear light teal shirts and dark green pants,  in the Air Force light blue shirts and navy blue pants, and in the Navy white shirts and navy blue pants. Depending on position Officers with the rank of Captain and above may additionally substitute their boots for oxford dress shoes.

Some corps or units have small variations in their uniforms - for instance, military policemen wear a white belt and white police hat. Similarly, while most IDF soldiers are issued black leather boots, some units issue reddish-brown leather boots for historical reasons- The Paratroopers, Nahal and Kfir brigades, as well as the Border Protection Infantry and some SF units (Sayeret Matkal, Oketz, Duvdevan, Maglan, Lotar (Counter-Terror School)). Additionally, certain special operations units are issued canvas hiking boots for wear during missions.

Berets

Each corps in the Israel Defense Forces has a beret of a different color and/or a different beret pin worn by its soldiers, independent of rank and position. Israel Defense Forces soldiers wear berets on their heads only on formal occasions, such as ceremonies and roll calls. The beret is placed beneath the left shoulder strap while wearing the service uniform (alef), but not while wearing the combat/work (bet) uniform in the field. On base it is left to the unit's discretion whether to wear berets or field hats. Air force and navy officers, military orchestra soldiers and military police law enforcement soldiers wear combination caps. Formerly, male soldiers of all ranks wore combination caps, while female soldiers wore the garrison cap. In the 1950s, the beret was adopted as the default headgear for the service uniform. The color of the air force beret was blue-gray; armored corps, artillery, and special operations personnel wore a black beret. Paratroopers, following the pattern of the British Army, wore maroon, all other infantry wore olive drab. Combat engineers wore a gray beret. For all other army personnel, except combat units, the beret for men was green and for women, black. Women in the navy wore a black beret with gold insignia while men wore the traditional white sailor cap like that of the US Navy.

Beret pins
All berets in the Israel Defense Forces, other than general corps berets (when worn by recruits), have pins attached to their front, which represent the symbol of the corps. While soldiers may wear the beret of another corps due to serving at that corps' base, they will always wear the pin of their native corps. Each pin consists of the corps symbol as well as a certain ornament which also contains the name of the corps. Soldiers serving a term in military prison must wear a blank beret with no pins attached.

Shoulder tags
Typically, each IDF unit (yehida) has its own shoulder tag (tagei katef). Shoulder tags consist of a long section and a tip, which can be one of four shapes: a circle (commands, directorates and air force units except anti-aircraft), a square (Golani Brigade), a diamond, or a shield-like shape (most common).  Shoulder tags are only worn on dress uniforms, on the left shoulder attached to the shoulder strap.

Some of the IDF shoulder tags:

Commands

Branches

Corps

Insignia
Aiguillettes, Srochim in Hebrew are worn on the left shoulder* of the uniform to indicate a soldier's specific role a unit:
 Black/ Green: Commanders in the Section/ Squad Commanders’ Course
 Black/ Yellow: Instructor in Chemical Warfare
 Black: Commanders in the Officer Courses/ Advance Courses
 Blue/ Red: Military Police
 Blue/ White: Chief Sergeant of a Base
 Brown: Analyst
 Cerulean/ Orange: Search and Rescue
 Dark Blue: Navy Instructors
 Gold: Discipline Attaché
 Green: Section/ Squad Commander
 Grey: Educators/ Teachers (in the Education and Youth Corp)
 Pink: Multimedia Producer or Officer in an Educational Course 
 Purple: Service Rights Attaché
 Red: IDF Orchestra (*Right Shoulder), Navy Instructor (Left Shoulder)
 White: Security Guards
 Yellow/ White: Field Intelligence Personnel

References

External links
 Unit tags of the IDF

Bibliography

Israel Defense Forces
Military insignia